Elizabeth Jill Cowley (born 1940) is a British botanist, who has worked at the Royal Botanic Gardens, Kew. Her interests have included the tropical flora of East Africa and the genus Roscoea.

After working at a nursery at Tadworth, Surrey, she took a horticultural course at Merrist Wood Farm Institute (1958), then worked at Elm Garden Nurseries, Claygate for eight years. She then worked in Geneva, Switzerland, and Millers of Send, near Guildford. She started working at Kew Gardens in 1968 in the Temperate House, Himalaya section. In 1972 she moved to work in the Herbarium, working on petaloid monocots, retiring in 2000. She took part in collecting trips to Korea, Turkey and China. She remained an Honorary Research Associate.

Born Elizabeth Jill Bedwell, she married Richard Cowley, a Kew student, in 1970.

Some publications

Books

Others

References

English botanists
1940 births
Living people
Women botanists
Place of birth missing (living people)
Botanists active in Africa
Botanists active in Asia
Botanists with author abbreviations
20th-century British botanists
21st-century British botanists
20th-century British women scientists
21st-century British women scientists
Botanists active in Kew Gardens